The West Coast Infrastructure Exchange (WCX), a State/Provincial Government-level partnership between California, Oregon, Washington, and British Columbia that was launched in 2012, conducts business case evaluations for selected infrastructure projects and connects private investment with public infrastructure opportunities. The platform aims to replace traditional approaches to infrastructure financing and development with "performance-based infrastructure" marked by projects that are funded where possible by internal rates of return, as opposed to tax dollars, and evaluated according to life-cycle social, ecological and economic impacts, as opposed to capacity addition and capital cost.

Inception

According to the original Wikipedia post, created by staff of Oregon Governor John Kitzhaber in November 2012:

Focus and activities
WCX is a 501(c)(3) not-for-profit organization that was formed I 2014 by the states of Oregon, Washington, and California. WCX is a publicly funded resource to public agencies within three west coast states on the topic of Performance-Based Infrastructure (PBI). WCX provides training, education, and technical assistance to interested organizations.

Performance-Based Infrastructure (PBI) is an infrastructure delivery method that consolidates responsibility for the key aspects of a project's full life cycle (design, construction, and long-term maintenance) into a single, performance-based contract with a private partner. PBI maintains public ownership of the infrastructure and can provide such benefits as increased cost and schedule certainty, shortened design and construction timelines, and long-term performance guarantees.

WCX has been recognized by multiple organizations and news outlets for its innovative efforts. WCX was also named a Harvard Ash Center Bright Idea in Government in 2015.

See also
 Public-private partnerships in the United States

References

External links
 

Infrastructure in the United States
Government of California
Government of Oregon
Government of Washington (state)
Government of British Columbia
501(c)(3) organizations
2010s establishments in the United States
Organizations based in Portland, Oregon
Economy of California
Economy of Oregon
Economy of Washington (state)
Economy of British Columbia
Infrastructure in California
Infrastructure in Oregon
Infrastructure in Washington (state)
Infrastructure in Canada